Starr Roxanne Hiltz is a retired Distinguished Professor of Information Science/Information Systems at New Jersey Institute of Technology (NJIT). She, along with Murray Turoff (her husband), are the authors of The Network Nation, a book that is described as "the seminal book that helped define the electronic frontier".

Awards and honors
 Electronic Frontier Foundation Pioneer Award (1994)
 Sloan-C Award for "Most Outstanding Achievement in Online Teaching and Learning by an Individual”  (2004)
 Named as Fulbright-University of Salzburg Distinguished Chair in Communications and Media (2008)

References

Further reading

External links
"NJIT Experts Guide"
"Home-Page of Dr. Starr Roxanne Hiltz"

Living people
Academic staff of the University of Salzburg
New Jersey Institute of Technology faculty
Vassar College alumni
Columbia University alumni
American computer scientists
American women computer scientists
Year of birth missing (living people)
American women academics
21st-century American women